Teldenia unistrigata is a species of moth in the family Drepanidae. It was described by Warren in 1896. It is found on Peninsular Malaysia, Borneo, Sumatra, the Philippines, Sulawesi and New Guinea.

The forewings are white with a narrow pale ochreous costa and a curved ochreous line from two-thirds of the costa to four-fifths of the inner margin. The hindwings have the ochreous line parallel to the hindmargin at four-fifths.

References

Moths described in 1896
Drepaninae
Moths of Asia